Return of the Frontiersman is a 1950 American Western film directed by Richard L. Bare and written by Edna Anhalt. The film stars Gordon MacRae, Julie London, Rory Calhoun, Jack Holt, Fred Clark and Edwin Rand. The film was released by Warner Bros. on June 24, 1950.

Plot
After the territory of Laramie, Wyoming has had law and order restored by men known as the Frontiersman, sheriff Sam Barrett has a peaceful town. At least until a fight breaks out between his grown son, Logan, and a man named Kearney who has been wounded by one of Logan's bullets.

Newspaper editor Larrabee explains to the sheriff what happened. Larrabee was accused of cheating at cards by Kearney, who drew a gun on him. But because the editor was unarmed, Logan stepped in and shot the gun from Kearney's hand.

Sam believes the fair thing is to give Logan and Kearney each 10 days in jail. Kearney is livid, though, accusing the sheriff of favorable bias toward his son. Later that day at Kearney's ranch, Ryan, a ranch hand, sees Logan standing over Kearney's dead body.

A posse is formed. Logan runs into a doctor's daughter, Janie Martin, and explains his situation. A bank is robbed and the banker shot by a man fitting Logan's description, riding off on a pinto, which is what Logan rides. Larrabee helps him get away.

Janie spots a man in similar garb on a pinto and realizes Logan's been telling the truth about being innocent. Sam goes to help his son and discovers Larrabee is behind the killing and robbery. Janie is held hostage, but Logan and his father, fighting side by side, save the day.

Cast 
Gordon MacRae as Logan Barrett
Julie London as Janie Martin
Rory Calhoun as Larrabee
Jack Holt as Sheriff Sam Barrett
Fred Clark as Ryan
Edwin Rand as Kearney
Raymond Bond as Dr. J. A. Martin
John Doucette as Evans
Matt McHugh as Harvey
Britt Wood as Barney
Dan White as Nicol

Production
The film was meant to star Alexis Smith but she refused to appear.

References

External links 
 

1950 films
Warner Bros. films
American Western (genre) films
1950 Western (genre) films
Films directed by Richard L. Bare
Films scored by David Buttolph
Films with screenplays by Edna Anhalt
Films set in Wyoming
1950s English-language films
1950s American films